Barilius mesopotamicus, the Mesopotamian minnow or Mesopotamian barilius, is a species of fish in the family Cyprinidae.

References

mesopotamicus
Fish described in 1932